Donis is a Lithuanian ambient, neofolk and experimental music project created by the Klaipėda multi-instrumentalist Donatas Bielkauskas. He was also a member of electronic music projects Wejdas, Notanga, Ha Lela, Eirimė.

Donis has released 8 CDs. Most of Donis’ works are musical interpretations of Baltic tribal ethnomusic. His most well known album is Bitė Lingo. It has 8 archaic Lithuanian war songs interpreted by folk vocalist Rasa Serra. The album Švilpiai contains ancient ocarina (švilpynė) music. The album Sotvaras is made together with famous Lithuanian pagan band Kūlgrinda members. Donis has also made an album of a Greek mythology theme Alexandreia and some experimental-electronic works.

Awards 
 A.LT 2006 – the best ethno artist

Discography 
 1998 – Deinaina
 2002 – Baltos Juodos Klajos
 2003 – Švilpiai
 2003 – Sotvaras, with Kūlgrinda
 2004 – Vacuum
 2006 – Bite lingo, with singer Rasa Serra
 2007 – Alexandreia
 2010 – Kas tave šaukia, with singer Rasa Serra
 2013 – Bars Bars

References

External links
 Official website
 Musical information and realize center

Lithuanian folk musicians
Ambient music groups
Musicians from Klaipėda